Maurizio Divano (born 27 August 1961) is an Italian swimmer. He competed in two events at the 1984 Summer Olympics.

References

External links
 

1961 births
Living people
Italian male swimmers
Olympic swimmers of Italy
Swimmers at the 1984 Summer Olympics
Sportspeople from Genoa
Swimmers at the 1979 Mediterranean Games